Platismatia lacunosa is a species of corticolous (bark-dwelling), foliose lichen in the family Parmeliaceae. Known predominantly from western North America, it was first formally described in 1803 by Erik Acharius. William and Chicita Culberson transferred it to the genus Platismatia in 1968. P. lacunosa was recorded from the Commander Islands in the Russian Far East in 2021.

References

Parmeliaceae
Lichen species
Lichens described in 1803
Lichens of North America
Lichens of the Russian Far East
Taxa named by Erik Acharius